United Democratic Alliance may refer to:

United Democratic Alliance (Liberia)
United Democratic Alliance (Zambia)
United Democratic Alliance (Kenya)
United Democratic Alliance (Uttar Pradesh)
United Democratic Alliance (Nagaland)
Malaysian United Democratic Alliance